Cyllopodini is a tribe of the geometer moth family (Geometridae), with about 68 species in 7 genera and 2 genera with 7 species tentatively associated with the tribe.

Genera
Atyria Hubner, 1823
Atyriodes Warren, 1895
Cyllopoda Dalman, 1823
Formiana Druce, 1885
Paratyria Warren, 1895
Smicropus Warren, 1895
Xanthyris Felder & Felder, 1862

Uncertain association
Myrice Walker, 1854
Oncopus Herrich-Schaffer, 1855

References

 
Moth tribes